Berlin-Mahlsdorf is a railway station in the Marzahn-Hellersdorf district of Berlin. It is served by the S-Bahn line .

It is the terminus for every second train during regular daytime service.

References

Berlin S-Bahn stations
Buildings and structures in Marzahn-Hellersdorf
Railway stations in Germany opened in 1895